Faisal Qureshi is a Pakistani television personality, actor, director, writer, drama producer and humorist. He is known for directing or writing comedy dramas, sitcoms, commercials and music videos.

Life and career
Faisal Qureshi was born in Hyderabad, Sindh. His father was principal of Government City College, Hyderabad. Faisal attended early schooling in Lahore and graduated in graphic designing from National College of Arts. He started his career as a play writer with his brother Imran Qureshi. Faisal wrote and acted in various plays and then became VJ by hosting a show Video Junction which was previously hosted by Hadiqa Kiani in 1995.
He gained popularity by producing the sitcom Teen Bata Teen which was aired on PTV Home in 1995. Faisal then directed many comedy-dramas and sitcoms including Ulta Seedha and Uski Suno Awaz which were aired on GEO Entertainment. He has also directed television commercials and music videos.

Films
Teri Meri Love Story (2016) as Don Raju
Teefa in Trouble (2018) as Tony
The Donkey King (2018) as Breaking News
Call To Action (2020)
Money Back Guarantee (2020)

Television

See also
 List of Pakistani television directors

References

External links
 
 

Living people
Pakistani television directors
Pakistani male comedians
Pakistani male television actors
Punjabi people
Male actors from Karachi
National College of Arts alumni
1973 births